Cornelius Sheehan (31 May 1889 – 21 February 1950) was an Irish hurler who played as a centre-back with the Cork senior hurling team. He was an All-Ireland Championship winner in 1919.

Career

Sheehan began his hurling career at club level with Redmonds. He enjoyed a lengthy career with the club, however, and won Cork Senior Championship titles as captain in 1915 and 1917.

At inter-county level, Sheehan first played for the Cork senior hurling team on 3 July 1910. He was a regular member of the team over much of the following decade and won four Munster Championship medals, including one as captain. The highlight of Sheehan's inter-county career was the winning of an All-Ireland Championship medal in 1919 after a defeat of Dublin in the final. He played his last game for Cork on 28 May 1922 in what was the opening round of the delayed 1921 championship.

On 21 February 1950, Sheehan died from bronchitis aged 60.

Honours

Redmonds
Cork Senior Hurling Championship (2): 1915 (c), 1917 (c)

Cork
All-Ireland Senior Hurling Championship (1): 1919
Munster Senior Hurling Championship (4): 1912, 1915 (c), 1919, 1920

References

1880s births
1950 deaths
Redmond's hurlers
Cork inter-county hurlers
All-Ireland Senior Hurling Championship winners
Hurling backs